Mate is a South Korean film released on January 17, 2019. The drama/romance film stars Shim Hee-sub, Jung Hye-sung, and Kil Hae-yeon, and it is both directed and written by Jung Dae-gun. Although the film only drew in 1,392 box office admissions    during its opening week, it was one of the ten films selected as finalists to participate in the 19th Jeonju International Film Festival 2018.

Plot 

Joon-ho (Shim Hee-Sub) first met Eun-ji (Jung Hye-sung) through a dating application and spent a night together. They later had another encounter when Joon-ho applies for a part-time photographing job at a magazine. The two developed feelings for each other, but they remained in an open relationship between friends and lovers. The term “mates” was coined because of their avoidance of commitment in the relationship.

Cast 
Shim Hee-sub as Joon-ho
Jung Hye-sung as Eun-ji
Gil Hae-yeon as Geum-hee
Jeon Shin-hwan-I as Jin-soo
Yoon So-mi as Da-hee
Song Yoo-hyun as Ji-seon
Han Sa-myung as Sang-won
Heo Jin as Kelly writer
Park Sae-byeol as Reanimation nurse
Kim Chang-hwan as Byeong-joo (cameo)
Kang Sook as Herb shop owner (special appearance)

References 

2018 films
South Korean romantic drama films
2010s South Korean films